Cyrtobill is a genus of Australian orb-weaver spiders containing the single species, Cyrtobill darwini. It was first described by V. W. Framenau & N. Scharff in 2009, and has only been found in Australia.

References

Araneidae
Monotypic Araneomorphae genera
Spiders of Australia